The Guwahati Police Commissionerate is the law enforcement agency for the city of Guwahati, Assam. It is headed by the Commissioner of Police.

Creation 

The Commissionerate of Police in Guwahati was formed on 1 January 2015. It is still in its early stages.

Re-organization

Due to the rapid increase in population, there has been a steady increase in crime. In view of the above the following structure has been instituted:
 The disciplinary and administrative control of the force is being held by the Commissioner of Police, having powers and functions of Additional District Magistrate.
 The city has been divided into three police districts: the West Police District, the East Police District and the Central Police District, headed by the Superintendent of Police ranked officers, known as the Deputy Commissioners of Police.
 The West Police District comprises one DCP, one ADCP (Additional Deputy Commissioner of Police) and ACP (Assistant Commissioner of Police) Azara, Guwahati and ACP Jalukbari.
 The East Police District comprises one DCP, one ADCP and ACP Basistha, ACP Sonapur, Assam and ACP Dispur.
 The Central Police District comprises one DCP, one ADCP and ACP Pan Bazaar, ACP Chandmari and ACP Noonmati.
 The All Women police station is being headed by the ACP Women Unit.
 Each police station is under the care of Inspector of Police who is the Station House Officer (S.H.O.), and performs all the duties and exercises all the powers of the S.H.O., except that of Pragjyotishpur, Guwahati PS and Sonapur, Assam Police Stations where Sub-Inspector ranked officers are Officers-in-Charge.
 The Crime Branch is being headed by one DCP known as DCP crime and one ADCP (Crime) and ACP Crime and ACP Cybercrime.
 The Traffic Branch is being headed by one DCP known as DCP Traffic, and two ADCPs and three ACPs.

List of Police Commissioners

External links

References

Metropolitan law enforcement agencies of India